Antiseen (often stylized as ANTiSEEN) is an American punk rock band formed in Charlotte, North Carolina, by Jeff Clayton and Joe Young in 1983. The name "Antiseen" serves as a deliberate deviation of the phrase "anti-scene" – the group not wishing to adhere to standard perceptions of punk rock in specific and rock music in general. Musically, Antiseen is influenced by groups such as the Ramones and Stooges, employing short, heavily distorted power chord-driven songs largely free of guitar solos or advanced musicianship. The band has a catalogue of over 100 LPs, EPs, CDs and DVDs recorded with various line-ups and have performed all over the world.

The band members consist of vocalist Jeff Clayton, bassist/drummer Sir Barry Hannibal, guitarist Walt Wheat, and bassist Malcolm Tent. Antiseen remains a performing and touring band.

History and side projects
After several years playing regularly throughout the East Coast and southern United States, Antiseen embarked on their first major world tour in 1992, performing in 19 countries in Europe and North America. This was repeated semi-annually for the rest of the 1990s. By the close of the decade the group tired of the routine and began to focus on shorter trips concentrating on individual regions (e.g. the west coast, east coast, midwest etc.) while returning to Europe for festivals.

In 1987, Jeff Clayton partnered with Thomas O'Keefe to form Judas Bullethead, an avant-punk outfit which released three EPs between 1987 and 1991. Clayton and O'Keefe performed under assumed identities controlled by the fictitious godhead known as 'Charlie'. Although only performing in public three times, the records were critically lauded and have become collectors' items. Reportedly, there is an entire album of unreleased material.

In 1988 guitarist Joe Young released a solo EP, Bury The Needle, which featured several Antiseen members.

Jeff Clayton has recorded two solo EPs, 'Jeff Clayton & the Slimegoats' in 1988 and 'Jeff Clayton & the Mongrels' in 2009. The Mongrels featured Mike Hendrix of the Belmont Playboys on lead guitar.

GG Allin used Antiseen as his backing band on his Murder Junkies album. The band has stated that this album was a mixed blessing, saying that although they regret the "backing band" stigma that it gave them, they loved the way the album turned out.
Sometimes it seems like that's all people wanna talk about. I don't regret those days at all, but we have done more than just that. We miss GG a lot though.
—Jeff Clayton
 
After GG Allin's death in 1993, Clayton fronted Allin's surviving band, also known as The Murder Junkies, for several tours.

In late 1994, Barry Hannibal joined the band as the drummer and has been a part of the band ever since, excluding a 5-year hiatus starting in 2006. In 2013, he returned to the band as the bassist. He is the third longest reigning member, with only Clayton and Young having been in the band longer.

Clayton has also appeared as lead vocalist on the Alcoholics Unanimous EP Dixie Fried. Additionally, he was involved as vocalist in the Simon Stokes tribute band Conqueror Worm (featuring members of Rancid Vat and Poison Idea), the album 'Rock inferno' by Australian band Rupture and has an uncredited backing vocal on Hank Williams III's Damn Right, Rebel Proud.

Clayton is also a producer; he has produced recordings by Hellstomper and Mad Brother Ward.

The band were also charter members of the now-defunct "Confederacy of Scum." The COS were a loose collective of bands including Rancid Vat, Seducer, Limecell, Hellstomper, Cocknoose, Frankenstein Drag Queens From Planet 13, Hammerlock, Before I Hang, and The Tunnel Rats. Many of these acts would unite yearly in various cities to stage a weekend long event known as the "Supershow." 

In 2003, Antiseen staged a 20th-anniversary concert in Charlotte which featured many past members of the group participating during the show. The set was professionally filmed and released on DVD.

In 2004, Steel Cage Records released a coffee table book entitled Destructo Maximus. The contents include interviews with current and past members of the band, testimonials of friends and fans, press clippings, reviews, and over 300 captioned photographs chronicling the band's history to that point. It also features fan artwork, a poster and flyer gallery, song lyrics, and a full discography.

In 2006, TKO Records released a tribute album entitled Everybody Loves Antiseen, which features 58 various artists including Hank III, ZEKE, Thomas O'Keefe, Chaos UK, Limecell, Texas Terri Bomb and Jeff Dahl, Simon Stokes and Blowfly.

On April 30, 2014, Clayton posted on his Facebook page that Young had died. It was later reported in local news that he died of a heart attack.

Antiseen has also collaborated with Hank Williams III. The band has appeared on split 7-inch EPs with Hank III, Electric Frankenstein, Brody's Militia, The Hookers, and Blowfly. Antiseen continues to play live tour dates.

Style

Music and lyrics 
Antiseen's lyrics deal with issues such as the military ("Stormtrooper", "Pledge Allegiance to the Bomb", "Warhero"), a love for the South ("Trapped in Dixie"), independence and pride ("Glad I Am The Way I Am", "Fuck All Y'All", "No Apologies"), songs supporting gun rights ("Guns Ablazin' "), and songs that defy political correctness ("Animals, Eat 'Em", "F.T.K.", "Spare Change", "Watch the Bastard Fry"). Antiseen's lyrics, which the band has described as satirical, are confrontational and caustic.

Clayton writes most of the band's lyrics, although on their most recent studio release, Badwill Ambassadors, Sir Barry Hannibal and Doug Canipe handled most of the songwriting duties. The band's instrumental work is fairly simplistic, as they rarely use guitar solos and mainly rely on using power chords in all guitar parts.

The band has written lyrics expressing their appreciation for professional wrestling by making musical tributes to various wrestlers, including Cactus Jack, Sabu, Terry Funk, and Abdullah the Butcher. Non-specific songs include "(I'm a) Babyface Killer" (sung from the viewpoint of a heel) and "From Parts Unknown" (a tribute to wrestlers who wear masks).

Additionally, Antiseen has covered songs by artists such as Hank Williams Sr., Skrewdriver, Ernest Tubb, Hellstomper, GG Allin, Anti-Nowhere League, Black Flag, Broken Talent, Alice Cooper, Dave Dudley, Bob Dylan, Roky Erickson, George Jones, The Kinks, Bachman–Turner Overdrive, Lynyrd Skynyrd, Blowfly, Curtis Mayfield, Roy Orbison, Ramones,  Rancid Vat, Rose Tattoo, Steve Sadler, Jumping Gene Simmons, Jack Starr, Sun Ra, Screaming Lord Sutch, The Stooges, Talking Heads, The Trashmen, and The Troggs.

Live performances 
Early Antiseen performances featured bizarre theatrical stage props involving mannequins, fake blood and pyrotechnics. Such performances found the group often banned from clubs unused to such presentations. Eventually the group tired of the logistics and legalities involved with a theatrical stage presentation and phased it out of their act, while increasing the physical mayhem of their stage antics – often destroying their own equipment. Vocalist Clayton began employing acts of self-mutilation, often cutting his face or arms with shards of broken glass or pounding his head with a microphone drawing blood and abrasions.

Political views 
Guitarist Joe Young was a member of the Libertarian Party, and stated that he had voted Libertarian since 1978. In 2000, Young ran for state house as a Libertarian. Young ran for city council in 2001.

The band members have stated that Antiseen is an apolitical band, although their songs have satirized extremist politics.

Both Young and Jeff Clayton have been at times supporters of the 2nd Amendment, Clayton especially being a firearms enthusiast.

Discography
Honour Among Thieves (1988)
Raw Shit (1989)
Noise For The Sake Of Noise (1989)
Destructo Blitzkrieg (1990)
GG Allin & Antiseen: Murder Junkies (1991)  (New Rose Records)
Southern Hostility (1991) (Man's Ruin Records)
Eat More Possum (1993)  (Man's Ruin Records)
GG Allin & Antiseen: Murder Junkies (1993) (Remastered) (Baloney Shrapnel Records)
Hell (1994) (Baloney Shrapnel Records)
Here To Ruin Your Groove (1996) (Baloney Shrapnel Records)
15 Minutes Of Fame, 15 Years Of Infamy (1999) (Steel Cage Records)
The Boys From Brutalsville (2001)
Screamin' Bloody Live (2002)
Badwill Ambassadors (2004)
 Antiseen/Electric Frankenstein split 7-inch split single (January 11, 2005, TKO Records 135 (United States))
Everybody Loves Antiseen (2006)
New Blood (2012) (Switchlight Records)
Falls Count Anywhere – A Collection Of Wrestling Songs (2012) (Rusty Knuckles)
Live In Austin, TX (2012) (Digital Warfare Records)
Live Possum (2013) (Jailhouse Records)
We're # One! (2016) (TKO Records)
Obstinate (2017) (TKO Records)
Dying Breed (2018) (TKO Records)

In addition to this, the band has released at least 35 different 7-inch vinyl records, including splits, live EPs and rare singles.

Band members

Current members
Jeff Clayton – vocals
sir Barry Hannibal – drums, backing vocals
Walt Wheat – guitar
Malcolm Tent – bass guitar, backing vocals

Former members
Joe Young – Guitar (deceased)
The Gooch – Drums
Doug Canipe – Bass
Greg Clayton – Drums
Dale Duncan – Bass
Marlon Cherry – Bass
Doug Throgmorton – Drums
Thomas O'Keefe – Bass
GG Allin – Vocals (deceased)
Tripp McNeill – Bass
Sir Barry Hannibal – Drums
Byron "Spitbubble" McDonald  –  Drums    (deceased) 
Lee "Flea" Howard  –  Bass
Steve Sadler  –  Drums
Brad Keeter  –  Drums    (deceased) 
Bill Cates  –  Bass    (deceased) 
Mitch Cooper  –  Drums
Joe Williams  –  Bass/Keyboards
Mad Brother Ward – Guitar
Dana "Ace" Davis  –  Lead Guitar
Jon Bowman  –  Bass
Phil Keller  –  Drums

References

External links
Official website
Myspace page
TKO Records
Antiseen interview by Spanky Payne for Twisted Press

Hardcore punk groups from North Carolina
Cowpunk musical groups
Musical groups established in 1983
Man's Ruin Records artists
Steel Cage Records artists